Rocky Comfort is an unincorporated community and census-designated place in northeastern McDonald County, Missouri, United States, on Route 76. It is part of the Fayetteville–Springdale–Rogers, AR-MO Metropolitan Statistical Area.

A post office called Rocky Comfort has been in operation since 1876. Some say the community was named for the rocky terrain in an idyllic setting, while others believe the name is a transfer from Rocky Comfort, Arkansas. The community is mentioned in Dennis Murphy's poem of 1941, The Doomed Race, and is both title and setting for Wayne Holmes' 2009 memoir, Rocky Comfort. From 1902 to 1908, when it moved to nearby Fairview, the Horner Institute, a private school offering courses from the eighth grade through high school, was located in Rocky Comfort.

Demographics

Notable person
 Travis Phelps, former Major League Baseball pitcher who was born in Rocky Comfort

References 

McDonald County
Northwest Arkansas
Unincorporated communities in Missouri